The 1969 National Football League draft was part of the common draft, the third and final year in which the NFL and American Football League (AFL) held a joint draft of college players.  The draft took place January 28–29, 1969.

The draft began with first overall pick of O. J. Simpson, the Heisman Trophy-winning running back from USC, by the American Football League's Buffalo Bills.  It ended with the twenty-sixth pick in round 17, number 442 overall, of Fred Zirkie, defensive tackle from Duke University, by the AFL's NY Jets.

Player selections

Round one

Round two

Round three

Round four

Round five

Round six

Round seven

Round eight

Round nine

Round ten

Round eleven

Round twelve

Round thirteen

Round fourteen

Round fifteen

Round sixteen

Round seventeen

Hall of Famers
 O. J. Simpson, running back from Southern California, taken 1st round 1st overall by AFL's Buffalo Bills
Inducted: Professional Football Hall of Fame class of 1985.
 Joe Greene, defensive tackle from North Texas, taken 1st round 4th overall by Pittsburgh Steelers
Inducted: Professional Football Hall of Fame class of 1987.
 Ted Hendricks, linebacker from Miami, taken 2nd round 33rd overall by Baltimore Colts
Inducted: Professional Football Hall of Fame class of 1990.
 Charlie Joiner, wide receiver from Grambling State, taken 4th round 93rd overall by AFL's Houston Oilers
Inducted: Professional Football Hall of Fame class of 1996.
 Roger Wehrli, cornerback from Missouri, taken 1st round 19th overall by St. Louis Cardinals
Inducted: Professional Football Hall of Fame class of 2007.
 Ken Riley, defensive back from Florida A&M, taken 6th round 135th overall by Cincinnati Bengals
Inducted: Professional Football Hall of Fame class of 2023.

Notable undrafted players

References

External links
 NFL.com – 1969 Draft
 databaseFootball.com – 1969 Draft
 Pro Football Hall of Fame

National Football League Draft
NFL Draft
Draft
Draft
NFL Draft
NFL Draft
American football in New York City
1960s in Manhattan
Sporting events in New York City
Sports in Manhattan